Reginald Walter Kember (born 15 April 1983) is a South African rugby union footballer.   He plays either as a flanker or eighthman. He most recently represented the Pumas in the Currie Cup and Vodacom Cup having previously played for the Mighty Elephants, Golden Lions and Leopards.

External links
 
 itsrugby.co.uk profile

1983 births
Living people
People from Raymond Mhlaba Local Municipality
White South African people
South African rugby union players
Rugby union flankers
Rugby union number eights
Pumas (Currie Cup) players
Golden Lions players
Lions (United Rugby Championship) players
Eastern Province Elephants players
Leopards (rugby union) players
Rugby union players from the Eastern Cape